Leeds Road may refer to:

 Leeds Road, former football and rugby league stadium in Huddersfield, West Yorkshire, England
 A660 road, West Yorkshire, England, between Golden Acre Park and the Otley bypass
 Leeds Inner Ring Road, motorway in Leeds, West Yorkshire, England 
 Leeds Outer Ring Road, main road around Leeds, West Yorkshire, England